Çukuroba can refer to:

 Çukuroba, İvrindi
 Çukuroba, Yenice